San Francisco Nighthawks is an American women's soccer team, founded in 1995. The team is a member of the Women's Premier Soccer League, the second tier of women's soccer in the United States and Canada. The team plays in the North Division of the Pacific Conference.

The team plays its home games at Kezar Stadium in San Francisco, California. The club's colors are red and white.

Players

Current roster

Notable former players

Year-by-year

Honors

Competition history
The Nighthawks, formed in 1995 as a charter member of the W-League, a division of the United System of Inter-regional Soccer Leagues (USISL). In 1998, the Nighthawks became a founding member team of the [Women's Premier Soccer League], a national amateur league for women soccer players with over 40 teams and 6 divisions.

The Hawks also play in the Golden Gate Women's Soccer League (GGWSL), a 50+ team, 8 division regional league based in San Francisco with relegation and promotion. The Premier Division includes many women who have played Division I NCAA soccer and want to continue competing at a premier level. The Hawks are four-time champions of GGWSL's Premier Division, having won the title in the fall 2006, spring 2006, fall 2005 and spring 2005.

The Nighthawks, in addition to providing a soccer program for San Francisco Bay Area women players, provide playing and training opportunities, coaching, instruction and learning opportunities for females of all ages in and around San Francisco. The Hawks organization also conducts low or no cost community soccer camps and clinics, staffed by experienced players and coaches, to teach playing and coaching skills to the community.

The Nighthawks, commonly referred to as the 'Hawks, play at Kezar Stadium during the WPSL season and at Boxer Stadium among others during the GGWSL seasons.

Team highlights
 Competed and won 2008 Las Vegas Silver Mug.
 Invited to and competed in the 2007 USASA National Cup Amateur Division Cup at the Starfire Sports Complex in Seattle, WA. The USASA National Cup Finals program is the oldest and most prestigious competition offered to all affiliated teams of the United States Adult Soccer Association.
 Played an exhibition game against the Ghana WNT Black Queens before a crowd of 2,000 in preparation for their 2007 African Women's Championship, a 2007 FIFA Women's World Cup qualifier. Before the game, nearly 500 boys and girls ranging in age from 6 to 18, received instruction in all aspects of soccer in a free clinic led by the Black Queens and the Nighthawks.
 Several Nighthawk players participated in a WPSL All-Star game versus the Ghana WNT Black Queens as a preliminary to the 2003 FIFA Women's World Cup.
 Fielded a team for scrimmages against the San Jose CyberRays, a member of the WUSA franchise.
 1998 trip to Shanghai, China where the Nighthawks scored a 2-1 victory vs. China. The roster included WUSA draft picks Emmy Barr, Tiffany Hadfield, Keri Sanchez and Jen Tissue.

Nighthawks in the community
The Nighthawks provide free annual soccer clinics for low income youth players, conduct fundraising events for inner city youth soccer teams and leagues (providing teams with uniforms, balls, nets and more), and fundraising events for the community.

The Hawks provide soccer coaching and education to players of all ages and skills. They provide to the community, a stable of knowledgeable, skilled and motivated female coaches, teachers, administrators and others who will share those attributes at little or no cost to the community.

Coaches
  Petra Kowalski -present

Stadia
 Kezar Stadium, San Francisco, California -present

Average attendance

External links
 Official Site
 WPSL San Francisco Nighthawks page
 Golden Gate Women's Soccer League

   

Women's Premier Soccer League teams
Women's soccer clubs in California
N
Association football clubs established in 1995
1995 establishments in California